Smolnica may refer to:

Smolnica, Szamotuły County in Greater Poland Voivodeship (west-central Poland)
Smolnica, Hajnówka County in Podlaskie Voivodeship (north-east Poland)
Smolnica, Suwałki County in Podlaskie Voivodeship (north-east Poland)
Smolnica, Złotów County in Greater Poland Voivodeship (west-central Poland)
Smolnica, Silesian Voivodeship (south Poland)
Smolnica, West Pomeranian Voivodeship (north-west Poland)